Alexei Kosourov (born July 29, 1979) is a Russian professional ice hockey player who currently plays for the Dizel Penza of the Supreme Hockey League (VHL).

Kosourov made his Kontinental Hockey League (KHL) debut playing with Torpedo Nizhny Novgorod during the inaugural 2008–09 KHL season.

References

External links

1979 births
Living people
Ak Bars Kazan players
Amur Khabarovsk players
HC CSKA Moscow players
HC Khimik Voskresensk players
Metallurg Novokuznetsk players
Sportspeople from Penza
Torpedo Nizhny Novgorod players
Russian ice hockey forwards